The 2008 Virginia Tech Hokies football team represented Virginia Polytechnic Institute and State University during the 2008 NCAA Division I FBS football season. The team's head coach was Frank Beamer. Prior to the season, the Hokies were expected to be in a rebuilding mode, recovering after the graduation of several key players. Despite that fact, Tech was picked to win the Atlantic Coast Conference's Coastal Division in the annual preseason poll of media covering the ACC. The Hokies were ranked the No. 15 team in the country at the start of the season, but suffered an upset loss to East Carolina in their first game. Tech recovered, however, and won five consecutive games following the loss, the ACC Championship, and the Orange Bowl. Permanent team captains were Macho Harris, Orion Martin, Brett Warren, and Ryan Shuman.

Schedule

Source: ACC

Roster

Coaching staff

Preseason
During the 2007 college football season, Virginia Tech accumulated an 11–3 record that ended with a 21–24 loss to the Kansas Jayhawks in the 2008 Orange Bowl. The Hokies also won the 2007 ACC football championship, but were not predicted to repeat that success in 2008. In the annual preseason football poll of media covering ACC football, Tech was picked second in the conference, behind the Clemson Tigers. The Hokies were picked to finish first in the ACC's Coastal Division, but lose to Clemson in the ACC Championship Game.

The reason for that second-place prediction was the loss of several key players from Tech's ACC-champion 2007 team. Virginia Tech lost its top four receivers, its leading rusher, and seven starters from a defense that ranked fourth nationally in total defense. Eight players from the 2007 team were taken in the 2008 NFL Draft, and Tech's 2008 team featured just 10 players who started during the previous season. Making matters more difficult for Virginia Tech, the Hokies suffered several preseason injuries and multiple players were kicked off the team for disciplinary reasons.

On August 26, Tech head coach Frank Beamer announced his intention to redshirt backup quarterback Tyrod Taylor, keeping him in reserve for the 2008 season. Following Virginia Tech's loss to East Carolina in the first game of the season, however, Beamer removed the redshirt and Taylor played in Tech's second game in the season. After he proved successful in that game, Taylor was named the team's starting quarterback for the remainder of the season, supplanting first-game starter Sean Glennon.

Game summaries

East Carolina

The Virginia Tech Hokies' first game of the season also was its first loss of the season. In a neutral-site game at Bank of America Stadium in Charlotte, North Carolina, Tech was upset 27–22 by the East Carolina Pirates. East Carolina, members of Conference USA, became the first team from that conference to win a game against a Bowl Championship Series member school since 2002.

The game got off to a slow start, as neither team scored in the first quarter. With 12:19 remaining before halftime, however, Virginia Tech scored the first points of the game with a 30-yard fumble return by defender Ryan Barnett #40 FR. out of Sulphur, Louisiana. Four minutes later, Virginia Tech's offense also scored, extending the Hokies' lead to 14–0. East Carolina answered with a touchdown before halftime, but Virginia Tech led 14–7 at the beginning of the second half.

The Pirates' offense scored another touchdown with 10:05 remaining in the third quarter, but the extra point kick was blocked and returned for a defensive score by Tech's Stephan Virgil. If the extra point had been successful, the teams would have been tied at 14 points apiece. Instead, Virginia Tech kept a 16–13 lead, which it retained through the third quarter. Early in the fourth quarter, Tech's offense extended the Hokies' lead to 22–13 with a touchdown. The extra point kick was missed. Both teams were held scoreless for the next ten minutes before East Carolina's Patrick Pinkney ran three yards for a touchdown. The score and extra point cut the Hokies' lead to 22–20 with less than four minutes remaining in the game. Tech attempted to run out the clock, but East Carolina's defense forced the Hokies to punt. The kick was blocked, however, and East Carolina's T.J. Lee returned the loose ball for a game-winning touchdown. With the limited time remaining in the game, Tech was unable to answer the touchdown, and East Carolina clinched a 27–22 victory.

Furman

Virginia Tech's second game of the season came against the Football Championship Subdivision (formerly Division I-AA) Furman Paladins at Virginia Tech's home stadium, Lane Stadium, in Blacksburg, Virginia. Despite the loss to East Carolina, Tech came into its home opener heavily favored and lived up to that expectation by beating the Paladins, 24–7. For the game, Virginia Tech wore a throwback uniform honoring former Tech coaches Jerry Claiborne, Charlie Coffey, Jimmy Sharpe and Bill Dooley.

The Hokies used backup quarterback Tyrod Taylor alongside starter Sean Glennon beginning with the fifth play of the game. Despite that change in offensive strategy, the Hokies were held scoreless in the first quarter. Tech's defense also held firm, and kept Furman from scoring in the first quarter as well. In the second quarter, both teams were again held scoreless until just 29 seconds before halftime, when Virginia Tech placekicker Dustin Keys kicked a field goal for the Hokies, giving them a 3–0 lead at halftime.

In the third quarter, Virginia Tech's offense finally hit its stride. With 8:41 remaining in the quarter, Sean Glennon completed a 10-yard touchdown pass to running back Kenny Lewis, Jr., giving the Hokies a 10–0 lead after the extra point. Tech added two more touchdowns before the end of the quarter, making the game 24–0 with one quarter remaining. The Paladins scored a touchdown in the fourth quarter, closing the gap to 24–7 and avoiding a shutout, but were unable to further catch up to the Hokies. Tech earned its first win of the season, bringing its overall season record to 1–1.

Georgia Tech

The Hokies' third game of the season also was their first Atlantic Coast Conference game of the season as Virginia Tech faced Georgia Tech at Lane Stadium. Tyrod Taylor, who had been the Hokies' backup quarterback at the beginning of the season, started the game and did not relinquish his position. Tech fell behind 3–0 in the first quarter, but took a lead in the second quarter that they did not relinquish through the rest of the game, winning 20–17.

In the game's first quarter, Virginia Tech was held scoreless while Georgia Tech took a 3–0 lead with a 32-yard field goal by kicker Scott Blair. Early in the second quarter, Tech answered the score by taking the lead with an eight-yard touchdown run by freshman tailback Darren Evans, who finished the game with 19 carries for 94 yards and the lone touchdown. Georgia Tech answered with a touchdown that came from a 41-yard pass to Roddy Jones. The extra point was blocked, but the Yellow Jackets still held a 9–7 lead with 3:44 remaining in the first half. Virginia Tech's offense answered quickly, however, mounting a drive that resulted in a Tyrod Taylor rushing touchdown with just 10 seconds before halftime.

The Hokies entered the second half with a 14–9 lead and maintained that margin through the third quarter. Early in the fourth quarter, Tech extended its lead to 17–9 with a field goal by Dustin Keys. Four minutes of game time later, Georgia Tech's Josh Nesbitt ran 18 yards for a touchdown. Instead of kicking an extra point, the Yellow Jackets attempted a two-point conversion and were successful, tying the game at 17–17 with 9:28 remaining. From that point, both teams' defenses dominated the course of play, and only Virginia Tech, with a 21-yard field goal from Keys, was able to score. That field goal was the margin of victory, and the Hokies edged the Yellow Jackets, 20–17.

North Carolina

Nebraska

Western Kentucky

Boston College

Florida State

Maryland

Miami

Duke

Virginia

ACC Championship Game vs. Boston College

Orange Bowl vs. Cincinnati

Rankings

Statistics

Team

Offense

Rushing

Passing

Receiving

Defense

Special teams

References

https://hokiesports.com/news/2009/3/20/20090320aaa_6511

External links

Virginia Tech
Virginia Tech Hokies football seasons
Atlantic Coast Conference football champion seasons
Orange Bowl champion seasons
Virginia Tech Hokies football